Herbert Kenneth Airy Shaw (7 April 1902 – 1985) was a notable English botanist and classicist.

Airy Shaw was born at The Mount, Grange Road, Woodbridge, Suffolk to a father serving as Second Master at the Woodbridge Grammar School and a mother descended from George Biddell Airy, Astronomer Royal (1835–1881). His younger sister was the illustrator Margaret Olive Milne-Redhead (also known as Olive Shaw). In 1921 he entered Corpus Christi College, Cambridge University, to read classics, but he switched to natural sciences, taking his degree in 1924 and finishing in 1925, then taking a position at Kew Gardens. He became an expert on tropical Asian botany and on entomology.

Selected works 

 The Euphorbiaceae of Borneo, Her Majesty's Stationery Office, 1975. .
 The Euphorbiaceae of New Guinea, Her Majesty's Stationery Office, 1980. .
 A Dictionary of the Flowering Plants and Ferns, 8th Edition. Cambridge University Press, 1973.

References 
 List of Australian Plant Collectors and Illustrators
 Obituary, H. K. Airy Shaw, 1902–1985, by A. Radcliffe-Smith and R. M. Harley

English botanists
English entomologists
1902 births
1985 deaths
Botanists active in Kew Gardens
Alumni of Corpus Christi College, Cambridge
People from Woodbridge, Suffolk
20th-century British botanists
20th-century British zoologists